United Nations Security Council Resolution 180, adopted on July 31, 1963, affirmed that Portugal claiming its overseas territories as part of metropolitan Portugal was contrary to the principles of the Charter.  The Council deemed Portugal's actions and attitude as seriously disturbing to peace and security in Africa.

The Council called upon Portugal to immediately recognize the right of the peoples of its empire to self-determination and independence, the cessation of all acts of repression and withdrawal of all military and paramilitary forces, unconditional political amnesty and the establishment of conditions that will allow the free functioning of political parties, negotiations to transfer power to freely elected representatives of the peoples and the granting of independence to all the territories under its administration.  The Council requested that all governments refrain from aiding Portugal in its repression in any way, including the sale of military equipment.

The resolution, proposed by 32 African states, was adopted with eight votes to none, with France, the United Kingdom and the United States abstaining.

See also
List of United Nations Security Council Resolutions 101 to 200 (1953–1965)
Portuguese Empire
Portuguese Colonial War

References

External links
 
Text of the Resolution at undocs.org

 0180
20th century in Portugal
 0180
 0180
 0180
 0180
 0180
Portuguese Angola
Portuguese Mozambique
Portuguese Colonial War
Portuguese Guinea
Portuguese Cape Verde
1963 in Portugal
1963 in Cape Verde
1963 in Portuguese Guinea
1963 in Mozambique
1963 in Angola
July 1963 events